Oro Blanco is a populated place situated in Santa Cruz County, Arizona, United States.

History
Oro Blanco was a mining community. Its population was 96 in 1902. Once a stage stop, the ghost town has some buildings and a small cemetery.

References

External links
 
 
 Oro Blanco – ghosttowns.com

Populated places in Santa Cruz County, Arizona
Ghost towns in Arizona
Cemeteries in Arizona